Metropol Theater or Metropol may refer to several theaters or cinemas:

 Metropol (Berlin)
 , formerly part of Komische Oper Berlin (1898–1945) and Admiralspalast (1955–1998)
 Metropol-Theater (Munich)

See also 
 Metropolis Theatre (disambiguation)

de:Metropoltheater